Samvel Karapetyan (born August 18, 1965) is a Russian-Armenian billionaire businessman who owns the Tashir Group conglomerate.

Biography
Samvel Karapetyan was born on August 18, 1965 in the town of Kalinino (now Tashir, Lori province) in the Armenian SSR.

Karapetyan graduated from the Faculty of Mechanical Engineering of Yerevan Polytechnic Institute in 1986. He moved to Russia in the 1990s and in 1997, he became the president of the Kaluga-based Kalugaglavsnab OAO, which provides logistics services, particularly to Russia's state gas company Gazprom. He then expanded into Moscow's real estate market. In 1999, he established the Tashir Group, a conglomerate of industrial, construction, supply and delivery companies, hotels, restaurants and other firms numbering more than 200 in total and employing more than 30,000 people.

Karapetyan's Tashir Group has made a number of investments and philanthropic endeavors in Armenia and the Republic of Artsakh. Tashir Group owns two large shopping complexes in Yerevan, as well as a major Armenian electricity company, Electric Networks of Armenia, among other enterprises. In 2013, Karapetyan financed the construction of a new hospital in Stepanakert, capital of the Republic of Artsakh. At the end of October 2020, Karapetyan vowed to rebuild the maternity hospital of Stepanakert City that was destroyed by the Azerbaijani bombardment on October 28. In September 2021, he announced that Tashir Group plans to invest $600 million to expand and modernize Armenia's energy sector.

In June 2020, Karapetyan paid the part of the 2 billion dram bail for ex-president of Armenia Robert Kocharyan's release from custody.

In April 2021, the Prosecutor General's Office of Azerbaijan opened a criminal case against Karapetyan for allegedly illegally transporting weapons to Nagorno-Karabakh, which Karapetyan denied.

Personal life
He is married, with three children (two sons and a daughter), and lives in Moscow. He owns an 85 meter Lurssen superyacht named ACE.

His brother, Karen Karapetyan (not to be confused with former prime minister of Armenia Karen Karapetyan), is a politician in Armenia from the Republican Party of Armenia and a former member of Armenia's parliament.

In 2011, President of Armenia Serzh Sargsyan awarded Karapetyan with the Mesrop Mashtots Medal "for significant contribution to the promotion of national interests, long term and fruitful pro-Armenian activities, dedication to the development and advancement of the Republic of Armenia and provided services."

In November 2017, he was appointed the president of the football club FC Ararat Moscow.

Wealth
According to Forbes, his net worth in September 2021 was estimated at $5 billion. In March 2013 Karapetyan became the richest ethnic Armenian in the world, overtaking Armenian-American businessman Kirk Kerkorian.

Ties to Putin
In January 2018 Karapetyan was named by the US Treasury Department in the Putin list, consisting of 114 senior political figures and 96 oligarchs, all of whom rose to prominence under Russian President Vladimir Putin.

References

1966 births
Armenian billionaires
People from Tashir
Living people
Russian billionaires
Businesspeople from Moscow
National Polytechnic University of Armenia alumni
Russian people of Armenian descent
Armenian businesspeople